Customer refers to the purchaser or client in business.

Customer may also refer to:
Customer (song), by Raheem DeVaughn
Customer (tax collector), collector of customs tax